Tanisha Smith (born May 11, 1988) is a former professional basketball player who was drafted by the Seattle Storm in the second round of the 2011 WNBA Draft. She played college basketball for Texas A&M and University of Arkansas – Fort Smith.

Texas A&M statistics 

Source

References

1988 births
Living people
American women's basketball players
Basketball players from Kansas City, Missouri
Seattle Storm draft picks
Texas A&M Aggies women's basketball players
Forwards (basketball)
Guards (basketball)